The Renggeri Formation is a geologic formation in France. It preserves fossils dating back to the Jurassic period.

See also 
 List of fossiliferous stratigraphic units in France
 List of fossiliferous stratigraphic units in Switzerland

References 

Geologic formations of France
Geologic formations of Switzerland
Jurassic France
Jurassic Switzerland